Dominique is the second studio album by the Finnish indie rock band NEØV, released on February 20, 2015 on Fullsteam Records. The album received highly positive reviews. Dominique produced four singles: "Laketown", "The Rain People", "Dominique I" and "Woolen Pumpkin Shirt".

For the bandleader and songwriter Anssi Neuvonen Dominique was the debut work as a record producer. The music videos for album’s singles were directed by Appu Jasu of a Finnish indie band The New Tigers.

In interviews with Savon Sanomat and Nordic Playlist, Anssi Neuvonen has said that Dominique is an album about love.

Critical reception
Dominique received highly positive reviews from music critics. Finnish music magazine Soundi gave it a score of 5/5 and wrote that band’s "aura is exceptionally strong." Another Finnish music magazine Rumba gave it a score of 9/10 and wrote that Dominique is "one of the best pop/rock albums of the year." German webzine NBHAP gave Dominique a score of 4.6/5 and praised band’s "own version of dream pop". Finnish newspapers Savon Sanomat and Keskisuomalainen stated that "at the moment NEØV is the best Finnish band in its form of art."

Track listing
All songs written by Anssi Neuvonen.

1. "Aurora" - 4:42
2. "Laketown" - 4:09
3. "Woolen Pumpkin Shirt" - 4:38
4. "Dominique I" - 5:35
5. "The Rain People" - 3:54
6. "Clouds On The Wall" - 4:59
7. "Garden Road Sphere" - 5:28
8. "Dominique II" - 8:17
9. "Bengal Fires" - 3:59

Personnel
The following persons were included in the making of Dominique.

NEØV
Anssi Neuvonen - vocals, guitar, keyboards, trumpet, production
Samuli Neuvonen - drums, trombone, backing vocals
Ari Autio - bass, keyboards
Jonas Ursin - guitar, keyboards
Antti Hevosmaa - trumpet, flugelhorn, backing vocals

Additional personnel
Sampsa Väätäinen - recording, mixing
Jaakko Viitalähde - mastering
Anka Zhuravleva - illustration (front cover)
Appu Jasu - cover art

References

2015 albums
NEØV albums